The Fencing competition at the 2006 Central American and Caribbean Games was held in Cartagena, Colombia. The tournament was scheduled to be held from 15–30 July 2006.

Medal summary

Men's events

Women's events

Medal table

References

 

2006 Central American and Caribbean Games
Central American and Caribbean Games
2006
International fencing competitions hosted by Colombia